The World Wide Fund for Nature defines a number of ecoregions that belong the deserts and xeric shrublands biome:

List of ecoregions

References

Desert and xeric shrublands